The Lycée Français de San Francisco (LFSF), previously known as the Lycée Français La Pérouse, is a private school in the San Francisco Bay Area. It welcomes students from preschool through middle, and High School grades. It has a primary campus and a secondary campus in San Francisco and a primary campus in Sausalito in Marin County.

Their unique educational program is accredited by the French Ministry of Education and based on the French national curriculum, with a challenging English program featuring American History, American and English Literature, and Visual Arts. The school prepares students to graduate with both their French Baccalauréat and the American High School diploma.

History
The school was founded in 1967 by Claude Lambert and Claude Reboul as Lycée Français la Pérouse and was originally a satellite campus of the French American International School. The French School of Marin merged with the LFSF in 1986.

LFSF alumni include children of musicians, artists and actors, children of the ambassadorial and socialite scenes, as well as various members of European nobility, and there have been examples of extravagant donations to the school-including Picassos and Fabergé eggs. The school continually ranks among the best and hardest schools among the Lycée à l'Etranger system, with graduates attending Ivy leagues and Parisian prepas every year.

Campuses
Ashbury Campus: Preschool–Grade 5
Ortega Campus: Grades 6–12 This campus offers the French bac with the International option of the exam, an honor course of the baccalaureate.
Sausalito Campus (formerly Marin County French School): Preschool–Grade 5 also includes La Petite Ecole (part-time program for children age 2+) and the FLI program for a gentle integration after Grade 1.

See also

 Agence pour l'enseignement français à l'étranger
 Education in France
 French Consulate General, San Francisco
 American School of Paris - An American international school in France

References

External links

 Lycée Français de San Francisco

French-American culture in San Francisco
International schools in San Francisco
High schools in San Francisco
Schools in Marin County, California
Private K-12 schools in California
AEFE contracted schools
Educational institutions established in 1967
1967 establishments in California
French international schools in the United States
International schools in California